Brandt is a French brandname producing various home equipment, created in 1924 by Edgar Brandt as a part of Hotchkiss-Brandt. Today, the company currently is owned by Cevital.

History of Brandt

 In 1924, Brandt is established.
 In 1966, Hotchkiss-Brandt merges with Thomson (now Thomson SA).
 In 2000, Brandt merged with Moulinex.
 In September 2001, Moulinex became bankrupt and its activities were taken over by  Groupe SEB.
 In 2002, Brandt was taken over by Elco Holdings, an Israeli holdings and appliance company. 
 In 2005, Elco-Brandt was bought out by Fagor, becoming FagorBrandt.
 In 2014, The Algerian conglomerate Cevital bought Brandt.

Brands of the group 
 Brandt
 Sauter
 De Dietrich
 Vedette

Manufacturing facilities

current :
 Orléans (France) : Production of cooking appliances
 Vendôme (France) : Production of cooking appliances and kitchen hoods
 Sétif (Algeria) : Production of washing machines and dryers

former :
 Lyon (France) : Production of high-end washing machines
 Aizenay (France) : Production of microwaves ovens
 La Roche sur Yon (France) : Production of high-end washing machines, high-end tumble-dryers and dishwashers
 Verolanuova (Italy) : Production of refrigerators
 Nevers (France) : Production of components (essentially engines)
 Lesquin (France) : Production of refrigerators, freezers and wine cellars

References
 Groupe Brandt - Brandt brand
 Brandt Homepage (fr)

French brands
Home appliance brands